Potato Creek is a tributary of the Allegheny River in McKean County, Pennsylvania in the United States.

Potato Creek has many small tributaries, including Marvin Creek, which joins it in Smethport, and Cole Creek. Many smaller brooks and runs are also in this watershed.

According to local history, Potato Creek was named from an incident when Native Americans lost some potatoes when their canoe capsized in the creek. 

See also
List of rivers of Pennsylvania
List of tributaries of the Allegheny River

References

Rivers of Pennsylvania
Tributaries of the Allegheny River
Rivers of McKean County, Pennsylvania